Dereck Jerome Lively II (born February 12, 2004) is an American college basketball player for the Duke Blue Devils of the Atlantic Coast Conference (ACC). He was a consensus five-star recruit and one of the top players in the 2022 class.

High school career
Lively attended Westtown School in West Chester, Pennsylvania. He was selected to play in the 2022 McDonald's All-American Boys Game.

Recruiting
Lively is a consensus five-star recruit and one of the top players in the 2022 class, according to major recruiting services. On September 20, 2021, he committed to playing college basketball for Duke over offers from Kentucky, Michigan and Penn State.

Career statistics

College

|-
| style="text-align:left;"| 2022–23
| style="text-align:left;"| Duke
| 32 || 25 || 19.8 || .658 || .154 || .600 || 5.0 || 1.1 || .5 || 2.3 || 5.4
|- class="sortbottom"
| style="text-align:center;" colspan="2"| Career
|| 32 || 25 || 19.8 || .658 || .154 || .600 || 5.0 || 1.1 || .5 || 2.3 || 5.4

References

External links
Duke Blue Devils bio
ESPN profile
USA Basketball bio

2004 births
Living people
American men's basketball players
Basketball players from Philadelphia
Centers (basketball)
Duke Blue Devils men's basketball players
McDonald's High School All-Americans
Westtown School alumni